Littleton may refer to:

Places
In Ireland:
Littleton, County Tipperary
Littleton (electoral division) in County Tipperary

In the United Kingdom:
Littleton, Cheshire
Littleton, Hampshire
Littleton, Somerset
High Littleton, Somerset
Littleton-upon-Severn, South Gloucestershire
West Littleton, South Gloucestershire
Littleton, Guildford, Surrey
Littleton, Spelthorne, Surrey; originally in Middlesex
Littleton, Wiltshire
Littleton Drew, Wiltshire
Littleton Panell, Wiltshire
North and Middle Littleton, Worcestershire
South Littleton, Worcestershire

In the United States:
Littleton, Colorado
Littleton, Illinois
Littleton, Iowa
Littleton, Kentucky
Littleton, Maine
Littleton, Massachusetts
Littleton, New Hampshire, a New England town
Littleton (CDP), New Hampshire, the main village in the town
Littleton, North Carolina
Littleton, West Virginia
Littleton Township (disambiguation)

Business
 Littleton Coin Company, New Hampshire, United States

Entertainment
This is Littleton, an Australian television comedy sketch series set in the fictional town of Littleton

People
Littleton (name)

See also
 The Littletons (disambiguation)
 Lyttelton (disambiguation)